The Cessna Model 404 Titan is an American twin-engined, light aircraft built by Cessna Aircraft. It was the company's largest twin piston-engined aircraft at the time of its development in the 1970s. Its US military designation is C-28, and Swedish Air Force designation Tp 87.

Design and development

The Cessna 404 was a development of the Cessna 402 with an enlarged vertical tail and other changes. The prototype first flew on February 26, 1975.  It is powered by two 375 hp/280 kW turbocharged Continental Motors GTSIO-520 piston engines. Two versions were offered originally; the Titan Ambassador passenger aircraft for ten passengers, and the Titan Courier utility aircraft for passengers or cargo. By early 1982 seven different variants were available, including a pure cargo version, the Titan Freighter.  The Freighter was fitted with a strengthened floor, cargo doors, and its interior walls and ceiling were made from impact-resistant polycarbonate materials to minimize damage in the event of cargo breaking free in-flight.

Variants
 Titan Ambassador – Basic 10-seat passenger aircraft.
 Titan Ambassador II – Ambassador with factory fitted avionics.
 Titan Ambassador III – Ambassador with factory fitted avionics.
 Titan Courier – Convertible passenger/cargo version.
 Titan Courier II – Courier with factory fitted avionics.
 Titan Freighter – Cargo version.
 Titan Freighter II – Freighter with factory fitted avionics.
 C-28A Titan – Designation given to two aircraft purchased by the United States Navy.

Operators

Military operators

Royal Bahamas Defence Force

Bolivian Air Force

Colombian Air Force - 2 used by SATENA.

Dominican Republic Air Force

Royal Hong Kong Auxiliary Air Force – 1 acquired 1979.

Jamaica Defence Force

Mexican Navy

Nicaraguan Air Force

Swedish Air Force

Tanzania People's Defence Force

United States Navy (as the C-28A)

 Puerto Rico Police Department Two C404

Specifications (Ambassador I)

See also

References

External links

 Official Cessna Website
 Incomplete Cessna 404 Titan Production List

404
1970s United States civil utility aircraft
Low-wing aircraft
Aircraft first flown in 1975
Twin piston-engined tractor aircraft